Waisman is a surname that may refer to:

 David Waisman (b. 1937), Peruvian politician
 Marina Waisman (1920–1997), Argentine architect and writer
 Nina Waisman, American new media artist

See also:
 Friedrich Waismann, Austrian-British philosopher